Lucanus barbarossa is a species of stag beetle native to southwestern Europe and Northwest Africa.

References

Beetles of Europe
barbarossa
Beetles described in 1801